Centennial Regional High School (CRHS) is an English-language co-educational comprehensive public high school located in the Greenfield Park borough of Longueuil, Quebec, Canada, a suburb of Montreal. It was opened in 1972 and named to commemorate the centennial anniversary of Canada's confederation. The school's student body is culturally diverse. In the 2011-2012 year, the school adopted a house system in an attempt to raise school spirit. It was previously a part of the South Shore Protestant Regional School Board.

History
It opened in 1972 as the regional high school of the South Shore Protestant board. Upon opening it relieved Chambly High School. It was built within the Longueuil school board even though it was physically in Greenfield Park. Roderick MacLeod and Mary Anne Poutanen, authors of A Meeting of the People: School Boards and Protestant Communities in Quebec, 1801-1998, wrote that this caused "resentment" within the school boards that made up the regional board even though the placement of the school was "intended as a kind of compromise".

Programs and Services
Middle School Program
Talented and Gifted Program
Liberal Arts Program
Post-Immersion (French Mother Tongue) Program
English Program
Business and Career Education
Creative & Performing Arts
Languages/Language Arts
Mathematics, Science and Technology
Personal Development
Social Sciences
Student Support Center
WOTP Program

Notable alumni
Steven Crowder, political commentator, media host, and comedian. 
Murray Lightburn, musician, lead singer of The Dears.
Elisha Cuthbert, film and television actor.
Patrick Kwok-Choon, film, television, and stage actor.
Tod Fennell, film and television actor.
Elias Koteas, film and television actor.
Jamie Orchard, former TV news anchor for Global Montreal.
Jonathan "Jon" Lajoie, television actor and stand-up comedian.

See also
Riverside School Board (RSB), Quebec English-language school board responsible for CRHS.

References

External links
 Centennial Regional High School official website

Educational institutions established in 1972
English-language schools in Quebec
Riverside School Board
High schools in Longueuil
1972 establishments in Quebec